The Littleberry Pippen House is a historic house in Eutaw, Alabama.  The one-story wood-frame house was built in the early 1840s.  It features Greek Revival-style architecture, with inspiration drawn from Creole cottage forms.  It was added to the National Register of Historic Places as part of the Antebellum Homes in Eutaw Thematic Resource on April 2, 1982.

References

Houses completed in the 19th century
National Register of Historic Places in Greene County, Alabama
Houses on the National Register of Historic Places in Alabama
Houses in Greene County, Alabama
Creole cottage architecture in Alabama
Greek Revival houses in Alabama